The Clarín Entertainment Awards or simply the Clarín Awards is an award program that have taken place in Argentina since 1998. Sponsored by the Argentine newspaper Clarín, the event honors Argentine achievements in entertainment, sports, literature, and advertising.

Awards for best Argentine film
 Pizza, Birra, Faso (1998)
 Mundo Grúa and Garage Olimpo (1999)
 Nueve Reinas (2000)
El Hijo de la Novia (2001)
 Historias Mínimas (2002)
 El Fondo del Mar (2003)
 El Abrazo Partido (2004)
 El Aura (2005)
 Crónica de una Fuga (2006)
 XXY (2007)
 Aniceto (2008)
 El secreto de sus ojos (2009)

Awards for best novel
FULL ARTICLE: Premio Clarín de Novela

 Una noche con Sabrina Love (1998)
 Inglaterra, una fábula (1999)
 Se esconde tras las ojos (2000)
 Memorias del río inmóvil (2001)
 Las ingratas (2002)
 Perdida en el momento (2003)
 El lugar del padre (2004)
 Las viudas de los jueves (2005)
 Arte menor (2006)
 Composición (2007)
 Perder (2008)
 Más liviano que el aire (2009)
 La otra playa (2010)
 Lloverá sobre nosotros (2011)
 Sobrevivientes (2012)

See also

 Latin American television awards

References

External links
 Official website (archived)

Awards established in 1998
Argentine film awards
Dance awards
Radio awards
Argentine theatre awards
Argentine music awards
Argentine television awards
Argentine literary awards
Argentine awards
Latin American culture
Clarín Group